In case law, a test case is a legal action whose purpose is to set a precedent. Test cases are brought to court as a means to provide a clearer definition to laws with disputed meaning and/or intent. An example of a test case might be a legal entity who files a lawsuit to see if the court considers a certain law or a certain legal precedent applicable in specific circumstances. This is useful, for example, to validate later filing similar lawsuits.

Government agencies sometimes bring test cases to confirm or expand their powers.

Examples
Examples of influential test cases include:

 Plessy v. Ferguson (1896)
 Tennessee v. Scopes (1925)
 United States v. One Book Called Ulysses (1933)
 Brown v. Board of Education (1954)
 Griswold v. Connecticut (1965)
 Oneida Indian Nation of N.Y. State v. Oneida County (1974)
 Adams v Cape Industries plc (1990)
 Mabo v Queensland (No 2) (1992)
 National Westminster Bank plc v Spectrum Plus Limited (2005)
 District of Columbia v. Heller (2008)

See also
 Case of first impression
 Leading case
 Uncommon Law, or Misleading Cases in the Common Law, by A. P. Herbert; still further misleading case

References

Legal terminology